Pink Floyd: Their Mortal Remains is a touring exhibition of the history of the British rock band Pink Floyd, opening on 13 May  2017 (with a museum members' preview on 12 May) at the Victoria and Albert Museum in London, England, and originally scheduled to run until 1 October. After high visitor numbers, the exhibition's run was extended by two weeks, to 15 October 2017. It followed the V&As successful David Bowie Is exhibition.

Naming and marketing
The exhibition's title reflects the lyric "I've got a grand piano to prop up my mortal remains", from the song "Nobody Home", on The Wall. It was promoted with media appearances by all three surviving band members (David Gilmour, Nick Mason, and Roger Waters), and designer Aubrey Powell; as well as the flying of an inflatable pig over the V&A, and at the BBC's Broadcasting House.

Content
Treating the band's history in chronological order, the exhibition ends with their 2005 reunion at Live 8, with footage of the band performing "Comfortably Numb", using specially-remixed audio, delivered via AMBEO, a Sennheiser 3D audio technology, over 17 channels and 25 speakers, seven of which are subwoofers.

Objects shown include documents such as a page from Nick Mason's diary for 1968 and a 1975 tour rider, a "flower petal" shaped mirrorball used from 1973 to 1975, instruments, plus equipment including the Azimuth Co-ordinator and the band's Binson Echorec Baby effects unit. There are several props from the 1980 and 1981 The Wall concerts, including the face masks worn by members of the 'surrogate band', to make them look like Pink Floyd. Also on show are a hand-written letter from Syd Barrett to Jenny Spires, his then girlfriend; and his bicycle.

Future touring
The organisers plan to tour the exhibition internationally, for up to ten years. In November 2017, it was announced that the second venue would be Rome, Italy, opening  on 19 January 2018. The Los Angeles exhibition was originally scheduled to begin in August, 2021. It was delayed for 3 weeks due to global shipping delays caused by the Covid-19 pandemic. The show opened on September 3, 2021 instead. In October 2022, it was announced that the exhibition would be shown in Montreal, Canada, from November 4, 2022, to December 31, 2022.

Attendance
By late August 2017, the London exhibition had been seen by 300,000 visitors and was extended by two weeks to 15 October.

Venues

References

External links

 

May 2017 events in the United Kingdom
Exhibitions in the United Kingdom
Museum events
Victoria and Albert Museum
Pink Floyd